Richard Godfrey (by 1559 – 1631), of Salisbury, Wiltshire, was an English politician.

He was a Member (MP) of the Parliament of England for Salisbury in 1604.

References

16th-century births
1631 deaths
Members of Parliament for Salisbury
English MPs 1604–1611
Year of birth unknown